Günther Sewald (April 12, 1905 – November 25, 1949) was a German politician of the Christian Democratic Union (CDU) and former member of the German Bundestag.

Life 
Sewald was a member of the Bundestag from the first federal election until his death. He was elected via the state list of the Christian Democratic Union of Germany (CDU) in North Rhine-Westphalia.

Literature

References

1905 births
1949 deaths
Members of the Bundestag for North Rhine-Westphalia
Members of the Bundestag 1949–1953
Members of the Bundestag for the Christian Democratic Union of Germany